Albert Heijn is a supermarket chain in the Netherlands.

Albert Heijn may also refer to:
Albert Heijn (businessman) (1865–1945), Dutch entrepreneur and original founder of the Albert Heijn supermarket chain
Albert Heijn Jr. (1927–2011), Dutch entrepreneur, grandson of Albert Heijn